Doughnut shops (also spelled donut shops) specialize in the preparation and retail sales of doughnuts. A doughnut is a type of fried dough pastry. The doughnut is popular in many countries and prepared in various forms as a sweet snack that can be homemade or purchased in bakeries, supermarkets, food stalls, and franchised specialty outlets. They are usually deep-fried from a flour dough, and typically either ring-shaped or without a hole and often filled.

Overview

Canada

Doughnut shops have been described as common in Canada and as a "national institution", and doughnuts have been described as an "unofficial national food." Per capita, the largest concentration of doughnut shops in the world exist in Canada, and Japan has the second-highest concentration per capita. Per capita, Canadians eat the most doughnuts compared to all world countries. The large number of Tim Hortons restaurants in Canada (over 4,600) significantly contributes to this consumption rate.

United States
Within the United States, the Providence metropolitan area was cited as having the most doughnut shops per capita (25.3 doughnut shops per 100,000 people) as of January 13, 2010. Many doughnut shops, such as U.S. national chains, serve coffee as an accompaniment to doughnuts.

Listing

The following is a list of notable doughnut shops (i.e. shops whose doughnut sales have been the subject of significant coverage in reliable, independent sources).

See also

 List of bakery cafés
 List of coffeehouse chains
 List of doughnut varieties
 List of fried dough foods
 Lists of restaurants
 National Doughnut Day

References

Doughnut shops
Doughnut shops
Doughnut shops